The Teatro Ambra Jovinelli (literally "Ambra Jovinelli Theater"), formerly known just as Teatro Jovinelli, is a theatre located in Rome, Italy.

It was founded by the theater organizer Giuseppe Jovinelli, who intended to build a theater devoted to variety and comic representations which had a luxurious face and which appeared stylistically rich and noble.

Built in  the ancient Esquilino quarter, construction work began in 1906 and the inauguration took place in 1909.

References

External links 

Theatres in Rome
Theatres completed in 1909
Art Nouveau theatres